The Fersen family, stylized as the von Fersen family, is a Baltic German aristocratic family grouped into several ennobled branches that settled in and around the kingdoms bordering the Baltic Sea in Northern Europe. The most well-known holders of the surname settled in modern day Sweden and Livonia (modern day Latvia and Estonia) which was once part of the Swedish Empire, and later of the Russian Empire.

Overview 
The family was first mentioned in the historical region of Pomerania in the 13th century.

The earliest records of the Fersen family in Livonia area in the late 17th century suggest possible links to earlier participation in the Northern Wars; service in Northern Europe was commonplace and Scots had served in great numbers in the series of Northern Wars, whose onset was marked by an invasion of Livonia by Ivan the Terrible in 1558. More secure is their participation in the Thirty Years' War (1619–1648). The official alliances of the Stuart regime, the independent diplomacy of the Scottish Parliament, and the actions of numerous well placed individuals at various European courts combined to make Scotland one of the prime providers of military manpower in Europe, with some 50,000 Scots fighting between 1618–1640. After the 1629 peace of Lübeck, many left to join substantial numbers of their compatriots in the Swedish army. During the 1620s the number of Scots serving in the Swedish army is estimated at around 20,000.

Estonian branch 
The Estonian branch of the Fersen family possessed several manor houses.

Swedish branch 
The Swedish branch of the Fersen family originally derived from the line in Livonia. After moving to Sweden, some of its members were awarded Countships for gallant military acts. This line is best known through its line of distinguished military service and for Axel von Fersen the Younger's possible love affair with Marie Antionette, suggested in court accounts and a recently uncovered series of "torrid" love letters.

List of people 
 Fabian von Fersen (1626–1677), Swedish general
 Otto Wilhelm von Fersen (1623–1703), Swedish general, Fabian's cousin
 Hans Reinhold Fersen (1683–1726), Swedish general
 Axel von Fersen Sr. (1719–1794), Swedish politician, son of the above
 Ulrika von Fersen (1746–1810), Swedish courtier, niece of the above
 Hedvig Eleonora von Fersen (1753–1792), socialite, cousin of the above
 Augusta von Fersen (1754–1846), Swedish courtier, cousin of the above
 Axel von Fersen Jr. (1755–1810), Swedish politician, cousin of the above
 Sophie von Fersen (1757–1816), Swedish courtier, sister of the above
 Fabian von Fersen (1762–1818), Swedish politician, cousin of the above
 Johann Hermann von Fersen (Unknown–1801), Saxon-born infantry general who served in the Imperial Russian Army
 Jacques d'Adelswärd-Fersen (1880–1923), French novelist and poet, related paternally to Hans Axel
 Johann Hermann von Fersen (died 1801), Saxon general in Russian service
 Hans William von Fersen (1858–1937), Baltic German admiral in the Imperial Russian Navy

References

ru:Ферзен (фамилия)
Fersen family
Swedish noble families
Swedish families of Baltic German ancestry
Estonian noble families
Livonian noble families
German noble families
Russian noble families